Kailash Surendranath is an Indian advertising filmmaker. Surendranath is best known for producing Mile Sur Mera Tumhara (unity-in-diversity) song in 1986 and directing revised version of the same in 2010. He directed the 2001 romantic comedy feature Love You Hamesha, that featured music composed by A. R. Rahman.

Career
After starting at the age of 18, Surendranath  has directed around 3,500 commercials in a career spanning 35 years.

His father is the well-known singer-actor Surendra.

References

External links 
 
 

Living people
Year of birth missing (living people)
Indian filmmakers